Douglas Metunwa Glanville (born August 25, 1970) is an American former professional baseball outfielder who played in Major League Baseball (MLB) for the Philadelphia Phillies, Chicago Cubs, and Texas Rangers. He is also a broadcast color analyst for baseball, currently working with Marquee Sports Network and ESPN, and a contributor to The Athletic.

In , Glanville batted .325, and placed second in the National League (NL) to Luis Gonzalez in hits, with 204. He was also known for his exceptional defense, having attained double-digit outfield assists on three occasions. Glanville also ended his career going 293 consecutive games without a fielding error. In the 11th inning of Game 3 of the 2003 NL Championship Series, he hit the game-winning triple for the Cubs. 
 
In , with no immediate prospects of joining an MLB roster, Glanville signed a one-day minor league contract with the Phillies, then retired, having collected exactly 1,100 career hits. He stated he wanted to leave baseball wearing the uniform of the team that he grew up as a fan of, and to which he gave most of his playing career.

Glanville is also a consultant with Baseball Factory, a high-school player development program, and writes guest columns for The New York Times and ESPN.com on baseball and sports in general. On April 1, 2010, he joined ESPN as a baseball color analyst. While at ESPN, Glanville appeared on Wednesday Night Baseball and contributed to Baseball Tonight, ESPN Radio, ESPN.com, and ESPN The Magazine. On April 27, 2017, it was revealed that he was to be among the many layoffs ESPN had made. He was hired by NBC Sports Chicago the following year. ESPN re-hired Glanville on March 28, 2019.

Glanville is currently teaching at the University of Connecticut Neag School of Education.

Background
Glanville grew up in Teaneck, New Jersey, where he attended Teaneck High School, graduating in 1988. His mother was a math teacher and his father a psychiatrist. He was a childhood friend of future basketball coach Lawrence Frank.

Glanville attended the University of Pennsylvania, where he majored in systems engineering. He is one of only five Penn alumni to play in Major League Baseball since 1951, and the first African-American Ivy League graduate to play in the majors. In 1990, he played collegiate summer baseball with the Wareham Gatemen of the Cape Cod Baseball League, and received the league's Outstanding Pro Prospect award.

He is an avid MMOG (Massively multiplayer online game) player along with former teammate Curt Schilling.

Glanville played center field for the Indios de Mayagüez for 2 seasons, in his first season he was named MVP of the Puerto Rico Winter League over Roberto Alomar. 
Doug Glanville will be best remembered for his 1999 season in which he batted .325 and hit 11 homers while driving in 73 runs and stealing 34 bases.

Business activities
After leaving baseball, Glanville served as managing partner for Metropolitan Development.

Currently, Glanville is President of GK Alliance, LLC, a Glen Ellyn, Illinois-based company providing intellectual capital for start-up and emerging companies. In his role with GK Alliance, he serves as Director, New Business Initiative for both James Romes Consulting and MechTechnologies, and President of Glanville-Koshul Homes.

Writing activities
Since January 2008, Glanville has been writing articles for The New York Times. On May 9, 2009, Glanville wrote an op-ed article in The New York Times regarding his choice to not use steroids during his baseball days. The article compared the decision to Neo's choosing between blue and red pills in the movie The Matrix. Glanville wrote that thoughts of his mother kept him from abusing PEDs. In an online blog article of January 21, 2010, Glanville responded to Mark McGwire's admission that he used steroids.

Glanville's book The Game From Where I Stand was published by Times Books in May 2010. Buzz Bissinger called it "a book of uncommon grace and elegance...filled with insight and a certain kind of poetry." 
In April 2014, Glanville wrote an article in The Atlantic on a racial-profiling experience.

See also
List of Major League Baseball career stolen bases leaders

References

External links

Doug Glanville at Baseball Almanac
Doug Glanville 
Doug Glanville's published articles at The Athletic 
May 2010 Chicago magazine story and video about Glanville and his book, The Game from Where I Stand
Archive of "Heading Home", Glanville's 2008 season column for The New York Times
 

1970 births
Living people
African-American baseball players
American sportswriters
Baseball players from New Jersey
Chicago Cubs players
Daytona Cubs players
Frisco RoughRiders players
Geneva Cubs players
Iowa Cubs players
Major League Baseball broadcasters
Major League Baseball center fielders
The New York Times sportswriters
Oklahoma RedHawks players
Orlando Cubs players
Sportspeople from Hackensack, New Jersey
Philadelphia Phillies players
Teaneck High School alumni
Texas Rangers players
Penn Quakers baseball players
Winston-Salem Spirits players
Wareham Gatemen players
21st-century African-American sportspeople
20th-century African-American sportspeople